Patrick Thomas Raftery (28 November 1925 – 29 September 1998) was an English former footballer who played as a forward. He played for Port Vale in the English Football League, as well as a host of non-league clubs.

Career
Raftery played for Stanfields, Norton Miners, Harriseahead, Ravensdale (in two spells) and Hull City before joining his hometown club Port Vale as an amateur in November 1948. After making his debut under manager Gordon Hodgson in a 3–0 home win over Leyton Orient on Christmas day of 1948, he signed as a professional the next month. He played two Third Division South games in 1948–49, and then played three league games in 1949–50 before being transferred to Wellington Town in February 1950. He later played for Stafford Rangers, Leek Town, Gresley Rovers and Audley.

Career statistics
Source:

References

1925 births
1998 deaths
Sportspeople from Burslem
English footballers
Association football forwards
Hull City A.F.C. players
Port Vale F.C. players
Telford United F.C. players
Stafford Rangers F.C. players
Leek Town F.C. players
Gresley F.C. players
English Football League players